Broad Leys is a house located in Ghyll Head, near Bowness-on-Windermere, South Lakeland, Cumbria, England. It is in the northern part of the parish of Cartmel Fell.

It was constructed in 1898 by Charles Voysey for Arthur Currer Briggs and mine owner from Yorkshire.  It was later purchased by the owners of Kendal Milne, a department store in Manchester.It is now owned by Windermere Motor Boat Racing Club  It was constructed in an Arts and Crafts style.

In 1951, it was acquired by the Windermere Motor Boat Racing Club and became the home of powerboat racing on Windermere, until the introduction of a 10 mph speed limit in 2005. Following discussions with the LDNPA exemption has been granted for racing on Windermere since 2013 and this allows the club to race from Broad Leys on specific days of the year.

The building is Grade I listed.

It was used as the location for the conclusion of the film The French Lieutenant's Woman (1981) and for the Agatha Christie's Poirot television episode "Dumb Witness" (1996).
Despite it being a private club, members of the public can book to stay (bed & breakfast; with evening meal by prior arrangement with the manager) in the house at certain times during the year unless there are pre-arranged club events taking place. Broad Leys is also available to hire for weddings on five weekends of the year and is ideal for birthday parties, christenings, funeral wakes and corporate events all subject to availability due to pre-arranged club events.

See also

Grade I listed buildings in Cumbria
Listed buildings in Cartmel Fell

References

Arts and Crafts architecture in England
Grade I listed buildings in Cumbria
Windermere, Cumbria
Buildings by C.F.A. Voysey
Houses completed in 1898
Grade I listed houses
Country houses in Cumbria